Idaho Legislative District 15 is one of 35 districts of the Idaho Legislature. It is currently represented by Fred Martin, Republican  of Boise, Steve Berch, Democrat of  Boise, and Codi Galloway, Republican of Boise.

District profile (2012–present) 
District 15 currently consists of a portion of Ada County.

District profile (2002–2012) 
From 2002 to 2012, District 15 consisted of  a portion of Ada County.

District profile (1992–2002) 
From 1992 to 2002, District 15 consisted of a portion of Ada County.

See also

 List of Idaho Senators
 List of Idaho State Representatives

References

External links
Idaho Legislative District Map (with members)
Idaho Legislature (official site)

15
Ada County, Idaho